The 2014–15 Oklahoma City Thunder season was the 7th season of the franchise in Oklahoma City and the 48th in the National Basketball Association (NBA).
The Thunder would suffer from injuries, mainly to Kevin Durant, who underwent surgery and was shut down for the rest of the season. Despite this, the Thunder remained in playoff contention, but a four-game losing streak at the beginning of April cost them as they finished 45–37 tied with the New Orleans Pelicans and were eliminated on a head-to-head matchup tie breaker. The Thunder missed the playoffs for the first time since 2009, resulting in Scott Brooks's firing 1 week after the conclusion of the regular season.

Previous season
The Thunder finished the 2013–14 season 59–23 to finish in first place in the Northwest Division, second in the Western Conference and qualified for the playoffs. Last season featured Kevin Durant being named the 2013-14 NBA Most Valuable Player. Durant earned MVP honors after averaging a career-high 32.0 points, 7.4 rebounds, 5.5 assists and 1.3 steals leading the Thunder to a 59-23 record with Russell Westbrook missing most of the season playing just 46 games.

Offseason

Draft picks

The Thunder had two first-round picks entering the draft. The Thunder traded their 2014 second-round pick in the Ronnie Brewer trade from the New York Knicks back in 2013 which was later traded by the Knicks to the Toronto Raptors. The Thunder's other first-round pick was originally acquired from the Houston Rockets as a result of the James Harden trade in 2012.

On draft night, the Thunder traded cash considerations to the Charlotte Hornets in exchange for the draft rights to Semaj Christon, the fifty-fifth pick.

The Thunder ended 2014 NBA Draft night with Michigan center Mitch McGary, Stanford forward Josh Huestis and Xavier guard Semaj Christon.

Trades
On June 27, the Thunder traded cash considerations to the Charlotte Hornets in exchange for the draft rights to Semaj Christon, the fifty-fifth pick.

On July 15, the Thunder signed-and-trade Thabo Sefolosha and the draft rights to Georgios Printezis to the Atlanta Hawks in exchange for the draft rights to Sofoklis Schortsanitis. The Thunder also generated a trade exception worth $4 million. On August 26, the Thunder traded Hasheem Thabeet and cash considerations to the Philadelphia 76ers in exchange for a 2015 protected second-round pick while also generating another trade exception worth $1.25 million.

Free agency

For this offseason, free agency began on July 1st, 2014 while the July moratorium ended on July 10. Caron Butler, Derek Fisher and Thabo Sefolosha were set to hit unrestricted free agency while Grant Jerrett was set to hit restricted free agency. Before the start of the 2013-14 season, Fisher announced his plans to retire following the season after 3 seasons with the Thunder. On July 3, it was reported that Thabo Sefolosha agreed to a three-year, $12 million deal with the Atlanta Hawks, which he later signed on July 15. That same day, Caron Butler signed a deal with the Detroit Pistons. On July 16, Grant Jerrett agreed to a deal to stay with the Thunder.

On July 15, Sebastian Telfair signed a deal with the Thunder. Telfair spent nine seasons in the NBA before playing interntionally with the Tianjin Ronggang in the CBA. On July 12, it was reported that Anthony Morrow agreed to a three-year, $10 million deal with the Thunder, which he later signed on July 16. Morrow spent the 2013-14 season with the New Orleans Pelicans. On August 14, Lance Thomas signed a deal with the Thunder. Thomas spent three seasons in the NBA, splitting time with the New Orleans Pelicans and the Foshan Dralions in the CBA during the 2013-14 season.

Front office and coaching changes
On July 5, the Thunder announced Darko Rajaković as an assistant coach. Rajaković joins the Thunder after serving as the head coach of the Oklahoma City Thunder for the last two seasons.

Season synopsis

Regular season
On October 12, 2014, Kevin Durant was diagnosed with a fractured right foot after feeling discomfort the day before and was ruled out for 6 to 8 weeks. He went on to miss the first 17 games of the season, and with Russell Westbrook also out for 14 of those 17 games with a fractured hand, the Thunder dropped to a 4-12 record prior to Westbrook's return on November 28 against the New York Knicks. Following Westbrook's return, Durant returned to action the following game on December 2 as he scored 27 points on 9-of-18 shooting in the 104-112 loss to the New Orleans Pelicans. With the duo back to full health, they went on to lead the Thunder on a seven-game winning streak to bring the Thunder back into playoff contention. On December 18, Durant injured his ankle during the second quarter of the streak-breaking 109–114 loss to the Golden State Warriors. Durant scored 30 points on 10-of-13 shooting in the 18 minutes he was on the court before exiting the game with the injury. He subsequently missed the following game the next night against the Los Angeles Lakers. Durant returned on December 31 versus the Phoenix Suns, and played 12 games before spraining the big toe on his left foot versus the Cleveland Cavaliers on January 25. He would play only six more games the rest of the season, having a procedure on February 22 to replace a screw that was causing soreness in his surgically repaired right foot. It was announced on March 21 that the Thunder might be without Durant for the rest of the season. The team then decided to shut down Durant for the remainder of the season after determining that he would need a third surgery on his right foot. Without Durant, the Thunder finished the season just missing the playoffs, missing the 8th seed by tiebreaker to the New Orleans Pelicans.

Roster

Staff

Standings

Conference

Division

Game log

Preseason

|- style="background:#fcc;"
| 1
| October 8
|@ Denver
| 
| Steven Adams (15)
| Adams, Roberson & Zanna (7)
| Reggie Jackson (6)
| Pepsi Center12,081
| 0–1
|- style="background:#cfc;"
| 2
| October 10
| @Dallas
|  
| Anthony Morrow (21)
| Jeremy Lamb (11)
| Michael Jenkins (5)
| American Airlines Center18,397
| 1–1
|- style="background:#cfc;"
| 3
| October 14
| Memphis
| 
| Jeremy Lamb (23)
| Thomas, Adams & Lamb (6)
| Russell Westbrook (12)
| Chesapeake Energy ArenaN/A
| 2–1
|- style="background:#fcc;"
| 4
| October 16
| @New Orleans
|  
| Jeremy Lamb (20)
| Steven Adams (8)
| Telfair & Roberson (3)
| Smoothie King Center12,202
| 2–2
|- style="background:#fcc;"
| 5
| October 17
| Toronto
| 
| Russell Westbrook (16)
| Andre Roberson (10)
| Russell Westbrook (8)
| Intrust Bank Arena13,161
| 2–3
|- style="background:#fcc;"
| 6
| October 19
| Minnesota
| 
| Perry Jones (21)
| Jones & Thomas (8)
| Adams, Jenkins & Talfair (3)
| BOK Center16,901
| 2–4
|- style="background:#fcc;"
| 7
| October 21
| Utah
|  
| Perry Jones (20)
| Steven Adams (8)
| Russell Westbrook (11)
| Chesapeake Energy ArenaN/A
|2–5

Regular season

|- style="background:#fcc;"
| 1
| October 29
| @ Portland
| 
| Russell Westbrook (38)
| Ibaka & Perkins (8)
| Russell Westbrook (6)
| Moda Center  19,411
| 0–1
|-style="background:#fcc;"
|2
|October 30
| @ L.A.Clippers
| 
| Perry Jones (32)
| Steven Adams (7)
| Sebastian Telfair (7)
| Staples Center 19,060
| 0–2

|- style="background:#cfc;"
| 3
| November 1
| Denver
| 
| Jones & Ibaka (23)
| Roberson & Thomas (8)
| Sebastian Telfair (9)
| Chesapeake Energy Arena 18,203
| 1–2
|- style="background:#fcc;"
| 4
| November 3
| @ Brooklyn
| 
| Reggie Jackson (23)
| Ibaka & Adams (9)
| Sebastian Telfair (6)
| Barclays Center17,732
| 1–3
|- style="background:#fcc;"
| 5
| November 4
| @ Toronto
| 
| Serge Ibaka (25)
| Serge Ibaka (11)
| Reggie Jackson (14)
| Air Canada Centre18,877
| 1–4
|- style="background:#fcc;"
| 6
| November 7
| Memphis
| 
| Reggie Jackson (22)
| Steven Adams (11)
| Reggie Jackson (8)
| Chesapeake Energy Arena18,203
| 1–5
|- style="background:#cfc;"
| 7
| November 9
| Sacramento
| 
| Reggie Jackson (22)
| Ibaka & Lamb (9)
| Reggie Jackson (6)
| Chesapeake Energy Arena18,203
| 2–5
|- style="background:#fcc;"
| 8
| November 11
| @ Milwaukee
| 
| Reggie Jackson (29)
| Steven Adams (10)
| Reggie Jackson (4)
| BMO Harris Bradley Center12,390
| 2–6
|- style="background:#cfc;"
| 9
| November 12
| @ Boston
| 
| Jackson & Morrow (28)
| Lance Thomas (13)
| Reggie Jackson (8)
| TD Garden17,043
| 3–6
|- style="background:#fcc;"
| 10
| November 14
| Detroit
| 
| Jeremy Lamb (24)
| Ibaka & Lamb (10)
| Reggie Jackson (12)
| Chesapeake Energy Arena 18,203
| 3–7
|- style="background:#fcc;"
|11
| November 16
| Houston
| 
| Thomas & Jackson (15)
| Reggie Jackson (11)
| Reggie Jackson (4)
| Chesapeake Energy Arena18,203
| 3–8
|- style="background:#fcc;"
| 12
| November 18
| @ Utah
| 
| Jeremy Lamb (19)
| Thomas & Adams (8)
| Reggie Jackson (7)
| Energy Solutions Arena17,190
| 3–9
|- style="background:#fcc;"
| 13
| November 19
| @ Denver
| 
| Serge Ibaka (22)
| Serge Ibaka (13)
| Reggie Jackson (9)
| Pepsi Center14,140
| 3–10
|- style="background:#fcc;"
| 14
| November 21
| Brooklyn
| 
| Reggie Jackson (21)
| Serge Ibaka (10)
| Reggie Jackson (8)
| Chesapeake Energy Arena18,203
| 3–11
|- style="background:#fcc;"
| 15
| November 23
| Golden State
| 
| Reggie Jackson (22)
| Anthony Morrow (12)
| Reggie Jackson (8)
| Chesapeake Energy Arena18,203
| 3–12
|- style="background:#cfc;"
| 16
| November 26
| Utah
| 
| Reggie Jackson (22)
| Steven Adams (11)
| Reggie Jackson (8)
| Chesapeake Energy Arena18,203
| 4–12
|- style="background:#cfc;"
| 17
| November 28
| New York
| 
| Russell Westbrook (32)
| Steven Adams (13)
| Russell Westbrook (8)
| Chesapeake Energy Arena 18,203
| 5–12

|- style="background:#fcc;"
| 18
| December 2
| @ New Orleans
| 
| Kevin Durant (27)
| Andre Roberson (9)
| Russell Westbrook (7)
| Smoothie King Center13,903
| 5–13
|- style="background:#cfc;"
| 19
| December 5
| @ Philadelphia
| 
| Russell Westbrook (27)
| Kendrick Perkins (9)
| Russell Westbrook (7)
| Wells Fargo Center 15,092
| 6–13
|- style="background:#cfc;"
| 20
| December 7
| @ Detroit
| 
| Kevin Durant (28)
| Serge Ibaka (13)
| Russell Westbrook (7)
| Palace of Auburn Hills13,090
| 7–13
|- style="background:#cfc;"
| 21
| December 9
| Milwaukee
| 
| Russell Westbrook (28)
| Durant & Perkins (9)
| Durant & Westbrook (7)
| Chesapeake Energy Arena18,203
| 8–13
|- style="background:#cfc;"
| 22
| December 11
| Cleveland
| 
| Russell Westbrook (26)
| Steven Adams (10)
| Russell Westbrook (8)
| Chesapeake Energy Arena 18,203
| 9–13
|- style="background:#cfc;"
| 23
| December 12
| @ Minnesota
| 
| Russell Westbrook (34)
| Steven Adams (11)
| Russell Westbrook (6)
| Target Center13,557
| 10–13
|- style="background:#cfc;"
| 24
| December 14
| Phoenix
| 
| Russell Westbrook (28)
| Kendrick Perkins (10)
| Russell Westbrook (8)
| Chesapeake Energy Arena18,203
| 11–13
|- style="background:#cfc;"
| 25
| December 16
| @ Sacramento
| 
| Russell Westbrook (32)
| Steven Adams (10)
| Russell Westbrook (7)
| Sleep Train Arena17,317
| 12–13
|- style="background:#fcc;"
| 26
| December 18
| @ Golden State
| 
| Russell Westbrook (33)
| Andre Roberson (12)
| Russell Westbrook (8)
| Oracle Arena19,596
| 12–14
|- style="background:#cfc;"
| 27
| December 19
| @ L.A.Lakers
| 
| Russell Westbrook (31)
| Steven Adams (10)
| Russell Westbrook (10)
| Staples Center18,997
| 13–14
|- style="background:#fcc;"
| 28
| December 21
| New Orleans
| 
| Russell Westbrook (29)
| Steven Adams (10)
| Russell Westbrook (8)
| Chesapeake Energy Arena18,203
| 13–15
|- style="background:#fcc;"
| 29
| December 23
| Portland
| 
| Russell Westbrook (40)
| Steven Adams (11)
| Russell Westbrook (6)
| Chesapeake Energy Arena18,203
| 13–16
|- style="background:#cfc;"
| 30
| December 25
| @ San Antonio
| 
| Russell Westbrook (34)
| Steven Adams (15)
| Russell Westbrook (11)
| AT&T Center18,581
| 14–16
|- style="background:#cfc;"
| 31
| December 26
| Charlotte
| 
| Russell Westbrook (29)
| Serge Ibaka (14)
| Russell Westbrook (5)
| Chesapeake Energy Arena18,203
| 15–16
|- style="background:#fcc;"
| 32
| December 28
| @ Dallas
| 
| Serge Ibaka (26)
| Serge Ibaka (10)
| Russell Westbrook (9)
| American Airlines Center20,417
| 15–17
|- style="background:#cfc;"
| 33
| December 31
| Phoenix
| 
| Kevin Durant (44)
| Kevin Durant (10)
| Kevin Durant (7)
| Chesapeake Energy Arena18,203
| 16–17

|- style="background:#cfc;"
| 34
| January 2
| Washington
| 
| Kevin Durant (34)
| Kevin Durant (8)
| Reggie Jackson (8)
| Chesapeake Energy Arena18,203
| 17–17
|- style="background:#fcc;"
| 35
| January 5
| @ Golden State
| 
| Russell Westbrook (22)
| Durant & Morrow(10)
| Russell Westbrook (5)
| Oracle Arena19,596
| 17–18
|- style="background:#fcc;"
| 36
| January 7
| @ Sacramento
| 
| Kevin Durant (24)
| Serge Ibaka (10)
| Westbrook & Jackson (4)
| Sleep Train Arena16,037
| 17–19
|- style="background:#cfc;"
| 37
| January 9
| Utah
| 
| Kevin Durant (32)
| Ibaka & Perkins (7)
| Russell Westbrook (12)
| Chesapeake Energy Arena18,203
| 18–19
|- style="background:#fcc;"
| 38
| January 15
| @ Houston
| 
| Kevin Durant (24)
| Kevin Durant (10)
| Russell Westbrook (8)
| Toyota Center18,315
| 18–20
|- style="background:#cfc;"
| 39
| January 16
| Golden State
| 
| Kevin Durant (36)
| Russell Westbrook (15)
| Russell Westbrook (17)
| Chesapeake Energy Arena18,203
| 19–20
|- style="background:#cfc;"
| 40
| January 18
| @ Orlando
| 
| Kevin Durant (21)
| Kevin Durant (11)
| Kevin Durant (8)
| Amway Center16,128
| 20–20
|- style="background:#cfc;"
| 41
| January 20
| @ Miami
| 
| Durant & Westbrook (19)
| Russell Westbrook (10)
| Kevin Durant (8)
| American Airlines Arena19,735
| 21–20
|- style="background:#cfc;"
| 42
| January 21
| @ Washington
| 
| Kevin Durant (34)
| Steven Adams (20)
| Russell Westbrook (8)
| Verizon Center20,356
| 22–20
|- style="background:#fcc;"
| 43
| January 23
| @ Atlanta
| 
| Russell Westbrook (22)
| Serge Ibaka (10)
| Russell Westbrook (11)
| Philips Arena19,203
| 22–21
|- style="background:#fcc;"
| 44
| January 25
| @ Cleveland
| 
| Kevin Durant (32)
| Serge Ibaka (10)
| Russell Westbrook (11)
| Quicken Loans Arena20,562
| 22–22
|- style="background:#cfc;"
| 45
| January 26
| Minnesota
| 
| Russell Westbrook (18)
| Serge Ibaka (19)
| Westbrook & Waiters (5)
| Chesapeake Energy Arena18,203
| 23–22
|- style="background:#fcc;"
| 46
| January 28
| @ New York
| 
| Russell Westbrook (40)
| Serge Ibaka (10)
| Westbrook & Jackson (4)
| Madison Square Garden19,812
|23–23
|-style="background:#fcc;"
|47
|January 31
|@ Memphis
| 
| Kevin Durant (15)
| Serge Ibaka (10)
| Russell Westbrook (5)
| FedEx Forum 18,119
|23–24

|- style="background:#cfc;"
| 48
| February 2
| Orlando
| 
| Russell Westbrook (25)
| Russell Westbrook (11)
| Russell Westbrook (14)
| Chesapeake Energy Arena18,203
| 24–24
|- style="background:#cfc;"
| 49
| February 4
| @ New Orleans
| 
| Russell Westbrook (45)
| Steven Adams (9)
| Russell Westbrook (6)
| Smoothie King Center17,156
| 25–24
|- style="background:#fcc;"
| 50
| February 6
| New Orleans
| 
| Russell Westbrook (48)
| Russell Westbrook (9)
| Russell Westbrook (11)
| Chesapeake Energy Arena18,203
| 25–25
|- style="background:#cfc;"
| 51
| February 8
| L.A.Clippers
| 
| Kevin Durant (29)
| Russell Westbrook (11)
| Durant & Jackson (6)
| Chesapeake Energy Arena18,203
| 26–25
|- style="background:#cfc;"
| 52
| February 9
| @ Denver
| 
| Kevin Durant (40)
| Mitch McGary (10)
| Russell Westbrook (9)
| Pepsi Center16,511
| 27–25
|- style="background:#cfc;"
| 53
| February 11
| Memphis
| 
| Kevin Durant (26)
| Kevin Durant (10)
| Russell Westbrook (9)
| Chesapeake Energy Arena18,203
| 28–25
|- align="center"
|colspan="9" bgcolor="#bbcaff"|All-Star Break
|- style="background:#cfc;"
| 54
| February 19
| Dallas
| 
| Russell Westbrook (34)
| Serge Ibaka (22)
| Russell Westbrook (10)
| Chesapeake Energy Arena18,203
| 29–25
|- style="background:#cfc;"
| 55
| February 21
| @ Charlotte
| 
| Russell Westbrook (33)
| Enes Kanter (13)
| Russell Westbrook (10)
| Time Warner Cable Arena19,303
| 30–25
|- style="background:#cfc;"
| 56
| February 22
| Denver
|  
| Russell Westbrook (21)
| Enes Kanter (12)
| Russell Westbrook (17)
| Chesapeake Energy Arena18,203
| 31–25
|- style="background:#cfc;"
| 57
| February 24
| Indiana
| 
| Serge Ibaka (23)
| Russell Westbrook (11)
| Russell Westbrook (10)
| Chesapeake Energy Arena18,203
| 32–25
|- style="background:#fcc;"
| 58
| February 26
| @ Phoenix
| 
| Russell Westbrook (39)
| Russell Westbrook (13)
| Russell Westbrook (11)
| US Airways Center17,514
| 32–26
|- style="background:#fcc;"
| 59
| February 27
| @ Portland
| 
| Russell Westbrook (40)
| Russell Westbrook (13)
| Russell Westbrook (11)
| Moda Center19,962
| 32–27

|- style="background:#cfc;"
| 60
| March 1
| @ L.A. Lakers
| 
| Ibaka & Augustin (18)
| Enes Kanter (15)
| Kanter & Augustin (5)
| Staples Center18,997
| 33–27
|- style="background:#cfc;"
| 61
| March 4
| Philadelphia
| 
| Russell Westbrook (49)
| Russell Westbrook (16)
| Russell Westbrook (10)
| Chesapeake Energy Arena18,203
| 34–27
|- style="background:#fcc;"
| 62
| March 5
| @ Chicago
| 
| Russell Westbrook (43)
| Serge Ibaka (9)
| Russell Westbrook (7)
| United Center21,696
| 34–28
|- style="background:#cfc;"
| 63
| March 8
| Toronto
| 
| Russell Westbrook (30)
| Enes Kanter (12)
| Russell Westbrook (17)
| Chesapeake Energy Arena18,203
| 35–28
|- style="background:#fcc;"
| 64
| March 11
| L.A. Clippers
| 
| Anthony Morrow (26)
| Russell Westbrook (9)
| Russell Westbrook (7)
| Chesapeake Energy Arena18,203
| 35–29
|- style="background:#cfc;"
| 65
| March 13
| Minnesota
| 
| Russell Westbrook (29)
| Enes Kanter (15)
| Russell Westbrook (12)
| Chesapeake Energy Arena18,203
| 36–29
|- style="background:#cfc;"
| 66
| March 15
| Chicago
| 
| Russell Westbrook (36)
| Enes Kanter (18)
| Russell Westbrook (6)
| Chesapeake Energy Arena18,203
| 37–29
|- style="background:#fcc;"
| 67
| March 16
| @ Dallas
| 
| Russell Westbrook (24)
| Kanter & McGary (13)
| Russell Westbrook (12)
| American Airlines Center20,231
| 37–30
|- style="background:#cfc;"
| 68
| March 18
| Boston
| 
| Russell Westbrook (36)
| Steven Adams (13)
| Russell Westbrook (10)
| Chesapeake Energy Arena18,203
| 38–30
|- style="background:#cfc;"
| 69
| March 20
| Atlanta
| 
| Russell Westbrook (36)
| Steven Adams (16)
| Russell Westbrook (14)
| Chesapeake Energy Arena18,203
| 39–30
|- style="background:#cfc;"
| 70
| March 22
| Miami
| 
| Enes Kanter (27)
| Enes Kanter (12)
| Russell Westbrook (17)
| Chesapeake Energy Arena18,203
| 40–30
|- style="background:#cfc;"
| 71
| March 24
| L.A. Lakers
| 
| Russell Westbrook (27)
| Enes Kanter (16)
| Russell Westbrook (11)
| Chesapeake Energy Arena18,203
| 41–30
|- style="background:#fcc;"
| 72
| March 25
| @ San Antonio
| 
| Kanter, Westbrook (16)
| Enes Kanter (10)
| Russell Westbrook (7)
| AT&T Center18,581
| 41–31
|- style="background:#fcc;"
| 73
| March 28
| @ Utah
| 
| Russell Westbrook (37)
| Steven Adams (14)
| Russell Westbrook (6)
| Energy Solutions Arena19,911
| 41–32
|-style="background:#cfc;"
|74
|March 29
| @ Phoenix
|
| Russell Westbrook (33)
| Steven Adams (16)
| Russell Westbrook (7)
| US Airways Center 17,538
| 42–32

|- style="background:#fcc;"
| 75
| April 1
| Dallas
| 
| Anthony Morrow (32)
| Enes Kanter (16)
| Russell Westbrook (10)
| Chesapeake Energy Arena18,203
| 42–33
|- style="background:#fcc;"
| 76
| April 3
| @ Memphis
| 
| Enes Kanter (24)
| Enes Kanter (17)
| Russell Westbrook (7)
| FedExForum18,119
| 42–34
|- style="background:#fcc;"
| 77
| April 5
| Houston
| 
| Russell Westbrook (40)
| Enes Kanter (17)
| Russell Westbrook (13)
| Chesapeake Energy Arena18,203
| 42–35
|- style="background:#fcc;"
| 78
| April 7
| San Antonio
| 
| Russell Westbrook (17)
| Mitch McGary (9)
| DJ Augustin (4)
| Chesapeake Energy Arena18,203
| 42–36
|- style="background:#cfc;"
| 79
| April 10
| Sacramento
| 
| Russell Westbrook (27)
| Steven Adams (11)
| Russell Westbrook (10)
| Chesapeake Energy Arena18,203
| 43–36
|- style="background:#fcc;"
| 80
| April 12
| @ Indiana
| 
| Russell Westbrook (54)
| Steven Adams (10)
| Russell Westbrook (8)
| Bankers Life Fieldhouse18,165
| 43–37
|- style="background:#cfc;"
| 81
| April 13
| Portland
| 
| Russell Westbrook (36)
| Enes Kanter (13)
| Russell Westbrook (7)
| Chesapeake Energy Arena18,203
| 44–37
|- style="background:#cfc;"
| 82
| April 15
| @ Minnesota
| 
| Russell Westbrook (37)
| Enes Kanter (15)
| Russell Westbrook (7)
| Target Center18,250
| 45–37

Player statistics

Summer league

|-
|Marcus Lewis
|5
|0
|12.2
|.750
|.
|.
|1.2
|1.6
|1.2
|0.0
|3.8
|-
|Semaj Christon
|4
|4
|26.3
|.485
|.
|.
|2.3
|2.8
|1.3
|0.0
|11.3
|-
|Ron Anderson|| 5 ||5||9.6 || .000||.|| .|| 2.8 ||0.6|| 0.2|| 0.0 || 0.8
|-
|Mario Little|| 4||0|| 19.0 || .357 || . || . || 2.3 ||3.0|| 1.3|| 0.0 || 10.0
|-
|Steven Adams|| 3||0 ||9.7 ||.600|| .|| .|| 4.7 ||0.7|| 0.3 ||1.0 || 9.7
|-
|Andre Roberson|| 4 ||3 ||29.0 ||.483 ||.||.|| 8.3 ||2.0 ||2.3 ||0.8 || 9.5
|-
|Josh Huestis|| 4||0||19.8||.429|| .|| . || 2.3 ||1.0 ||0.3 ||0.5 ||8.0
|-
|Fuquan Edwin|| 3||0|| 7.3 || .250 || .||.|| 0.3|| 0.0 ||1.0|| 0.0 || 1.3
|-
|Mitch McGary|| 4||4||26.0 || .500 ||.|| .|| 5.8 ||1.3 ||0.8|| 1.8|| 14.8
|-
|Perry Jones|| 4|| 4||27.3|| .447|| .|| . || 5.3 ||0.5 ||0.8 ||1.0 ||12.3
|-
|Jeremy Lamb|| 3||3|| 31.3|| .320 || .|| .|| 5.3|| 2.7 ||1.3|| 0.7 ||17.3
|-
|Maurice Sutton|| 3 ||0||3.7|| .333||.|| .|| 1.0 ||0.0 ||0.0||0.0 || 1.7
|-
|Michael Stockton|| 3||0|| 10.0|| .600||.|| .|| 0.7||2.7 ||1.0 ||0.0 ||3.0
|}

Preseason

|-
|Russell Westbrook
|6
|5
|22.3
|.369
|.100
|.920
|6.2
|4.2
|1.8
|0.0
|12.0
|-
|Kevin Durant
|2
|2
|15.0
|.500
|.333
|1.000
|2.5
|2.5
|1.5
|0.0
|11.5
|-
|Serge Ibaka|| 3||3||23.9 || .469 ||.500 || .500 || 5.7 ||0.7|| 0.0|| 1.7 || 11.3
|-
|Reggie Jackson|| 2||0|| 20.1 || .412 || .429 || 1.000 || 2.5 ||4.5|| 0.5|| 0.0 || 11.0
|-
|Steven Adams|| 7 ||7 ||25.7 ||.684 || .000 || .500 || 6.9 ||1.0|| 1.1 ||1.3 || 12.7
|-
|Anthony Morrow||6||3|| 24.9 || .475 || .448 || .950 || 2.0|| 1.3 ||0.3 ||0.2 || 15.0
|-
|Lance Thomas||6||2||22.2 ||.333 || .000 || .917 || 4.5 ||0.2 ||0.3 ||0.3 || 4.8
|-
|Sebastian Telfair|| 5|| 1 ||22.9|| .261 || .222 || .100 || 2.0 ||3.0 ||0.3 ||0.7 || 4.
|-
|Andre Roberson|| 7 ||3 ||28.0 ||.441 ||.400 ||.467 || 6.1 ||2.3 ||1.1 ||0.9 || 5.6
|-
|Richard Soloman|| 3||0||11.9||.667|| .000|| .500 || 3.3 ||0.3 ||1.3 ||0.7 ||4.7
|-
|Nick Collison|| 1||0|| 11.1 || 1.000 || 1.000 ||.000 || 0.0|| 1.0 ||0.0|| 1.0 || 5.0
|-
|Mitch McGary|| 1||1||36.0 || .500 ||.000 || .000 || 2.0 ||4.0 ||2.0|| 0.0 || 14.0
|-
|Perry Jones|| 6|| 1||23.7|| .410|| .286|| .483 || 3.5 ||0.5 ||0.2 ||0.5 ||11.7
|-
|Jeremy Lamb|| 5||1|| 32.4|| .304 || .143 || .771 || 5.6|| 2.6 ||1.2|| 0.8 ||15.8
|-
|Talib Zanna|| 7 ||0||17.4|| .400 ||.000|| .682 || 5.0 ||0.3 ||0.4||0.4 || 4.4
|-
|Michael Jenkins|| 7||0|| 17.5|| .400||.320 || .600 || 1.7 ||2.0 ||0.4 ||0.0 || 6.0
|}

Regular season

 Led team in statistic
After all games.
‡ Waived during the season
† Traded during the season
≠ Acquired during the season

Individual game highs

Awards and records

Awards

Injuries

Transactions

Overview

Trades

Free agency

Re-signed

Additions

Subtractions

References

External links

 2014–15 Oklahoma City Thunder preseason at ESPN
 2014–15 Oklahoma City Thunder regular season at ESPN

Oklahoma City Thunder seasons
Oklahoma City Thunder
2014 in sports in Oklahoma
2015 in sports in Oklahoma